James H. Buescher (born March 26, 1990) is an American professional stock car racing driver. He is the 2012 Truck Series champion.

After parting ways with NTS Motorsports in 2015, Buescher became a real estate agent. He owns and operates his own real estate agency, The Buescher Group, with his wife Kris in their home state of Texas. The company is part of the Compass Real Estate company. He would be without a ride until 2020, when he joined Niece Motorsports for one Truck Series race in 2020 followed by more races in 2021.

Buescher is the cousin of 2015 NASCAR Xfinity Series champion Chris Buescher, who competes full-time in the NASCAR Cup Series for Roush Fenway Keselowski Racing.

Early career
Buescher's earliest racing success came in 2004 when he became a national champion in the Young Gun division of Bandolero racing at Texas Motor Speedway. He then moved on to the American Speed Association where, in 2006, he was named Most Popular Driver as well as winning the Late Model Series South championship. For 2007, Buescher ran a part-time schedule in both the ARCA Series and the NASCAR Busch East Series. He became the youngest winner in ARCA series history when he won at USA International Speedway in his series debut. In six more races that season, he would earn an additional 5 top-10 finishes as well as finish in the top 10 in all 4 Busch East races he entered.

NASCAR Nationwide Series
In 2008, Buescher signed with Braun Racing to run six races in the Nationwide Series (now known as the Xfinity Series). He made his debut at Phoenix International Raceway in the No. 32 Great Clips Toyota. He started 17th and stayed in the top 20 all race long, finishing 18th. He would earn his first top 10 at Gateway International Raceway (finishing 7th) and his first pole at Memphis Motorsports Park. He would spend most of the 2009 season in the Camping World Truck Series. Near the end of 2009, Buescher was announced as the 2010 driver for Phoenix Racing. To prepare for the season, he ran two races in the No. 1 Miccosukee Resorts Chevrolet, finishing 11th at Texas and 13th at Phoenix.

A week prior to the beginning of the 2010 season, it was announced that Miccosukee was dropping its sponsorship of all NASCAR teams, effective immediately. Despite this setback, Buescher responded with an 8th-place finish in the season opener at Daytona International Speedway.
On May 12, 2010 Buescher parted ways with Phoenix Racing and returned to the Camping World Truck Series. He made his return to the Nationwide Series at Kansas Speedway in September driving for Turner Motorsports in the No. 11 Great Clips Toyota. He ran four additional races for Turner, earning his 2nd career pole at Texas in the No. 30 Chevrolet.

For 2011, it was announced that Buescher would run part-time in the series, sharing the No. 30 Chevrolet with several other drivers. On February 25, 2012, Buescher won the season opener at Daytona, avoiding a massive crash on the final lap and coming from 11th to win, leading only the final lap.

After the 2013 season, in which Buescher finished third in Truck Series points, he announced that he would be competing for RAB Racing in the 2014 NASCAR Nationwide Series, driving the No. 99 Toyota. Rheem was Buescher's primary sponsor, and he went on to finish 10th in 2014 Nationwide Series points. Buescher returned to the Truck Series briefly in 2015 before retiring.

NASCAR Truck Series
Buescher made his Truck Series debut in the 2008 Ford 200, the season finale. Driving the No. 15 Ergon Hyprene Toyota for Billy Ballew Motorsports, he qualified 10th and finished 19th. Prior to the start of the 2009 season, it was announced that Buescher would be replacing Brendan Gaughan in the No. 10 International Maxx Force Diesel Ford for Circle Bar Racing. He found little success over the course of the season and finished 14th in points. In 25 races, he accumulated just three top-10s, including a 5th at The Milwaukee Mile. At the end of the season, Buescher left the team to focus on his new Nationwide Series ride.

It was also announced that he would return to the Truck Series for up to 19 races in 2010 with Turner Motorsports.

After running the April Nashville race in the No. 90 Great Clips Toyota for Stringer Motorsports, Buescher ran the balance of the 2010 season in the No. 31 truck. In 21 races for Turner, Buescher would earn ten top-10s with two finishes of 2nd. He narrowly missed a win at New Hampshire, giving up the lead to Kyle Busch on a green-white-checker finish. Despite not running the first three events of the season, Buescher finished 11th in the final points standings, just 16 points out of 10th.

Turner Scott Motorsports announced that Buescher would return to the team for the 2011 season, running the full 25-race schedule. A promising start saw Buescher lead the first 55 laps at Daytona before his involvement in a multi-car crash on lap 97 left him ninth. However, Buescher failed to qualify for the next race at Phoenix. The No. 31 team was not yet guaranteed a starting spot because it had not attempted every event the previous season. Two races later, a wreck with Jeffrey Earnhardt at Martinsville dropped Buescher to 20th in the driver standings. Buescher responded to the setbacks with thirteen consecutive top-10 finishes including his first Truck Series pole position at Texas and a runner-up finish at IRP. A tenth-place finish at Atlanta gave Buescher the championship lead in a tight points battle with Austin Dillon and Johnny Sauter. Buescher lost the lead two events later but stayed competitive in the three-man race. He earned his second career pole at Talladega and was within eleven points of Dillon with two races remaining.

At Texas, Buescher won another pole position and led 56 laps, battling side-by-side with Dillon for much of the event. However, while running second, a caution waved on lap 142 for David Starr's blown engine. During the slowdown, Buescher ran out of fuel on the backstretch and had to be pushed to pit road. He lost fuel pressure and was lapped twice by the pace car before successfully re-firing his car. The 19th-place finish left Buescher with an outside chance at best for the championship finale at Homestead. There, despite scoring another pole, great runs by Dillon and Sauter and a run-in with Kevin Harvick solidified Buescher's third-place finish in the final point standings.

Buescher returned to Turner Motorsports for the 2012 season as a title favorite. After crashing on the final lap in the season opener at Daytona, he led 103 laps and earned his first career Truck Series victory at Kansas. He quickly followed with early-season wins at Kentucky and Chicagoland. The Chicago win began a run of nine top-ten finishes in ten races for Buescher. The streak, which included another dominating victory at Kentucky, secured a 21-point lead for Buescher over Ty Dillon, the younger brother of 2011 championship rival Austin, with three races remaining. Subpar finishes in the next two events, including a late-race blown tire at Phoenix, meant Buescher needed to score at least a seventh-place finish at Homestead to clinch the title over Dillon and Timothy Peters. Buescher struggled in the finale,  but went on to finish 13th and claim the 2012 Truck Series championship by six points over Peters, the first such title for Turner Motorsports. He survived a final push from Dillon, who closed to within one point of Buescher but crashed with three laps remaining while battling Kyle Larson for second place. Buescher's four wins were the most for a Turner driver since the team's entry into the series in 2009.

Buescher left to drive full time in the Nationwide Series for RAB Racing in 2014. However, he had a lackluster season, compared to his Truck Series success. In 2015, Buescher was picked up by NTS Motorsports to drive the No. 31 Chevrolet Silverado for a part-time schedule; Buescher participated in three races. However, after not be competitive in a well-funded ride, Buescher retired to help take care of his children.

In 2020, Buescher returned to the series in a one-off appearance for Niece Motorsports at Texas. He would return to Niece in 2021 for the season-opener at Daytona. With Carson Hocevar driving the No. 42 full-time that year, Buescher instead drove the team's No. 44 truck. His race would end early when Tanner Gray had an issue before the start and sustained heavy damage to the front end of his truck as a result of contact. He would ultimately finish 36th. It is unclear if he will attempt additional races for the team throughout the season.

Personal life
Born in Melbourne, Florida, Buescher was raised in Plano, Texas. Buescher has a cousin, Chris, who races in the NASCAR Cup Series for RFK Racing. He is the son in law of former car owner Steve Turner. Buescher married Krishtian Turner in January 2012, in a ceremony performed in Costa Rica. They have two children. In November 2014, Buescher and his wife founded The Buescher Foundation to provide resources and financial support to families adopting domestically.

Motorsports career results

NASCAR
(key) (Bold − Pole position awarded by qualifying time. Italics − Pole position earned by points standings or practice time. * – Most laps led.)

Nationwide Series

Camping World Truck Series

 Season still in progress 
 Ineligible for series points

Camping World East Series

Camping World West Series

Canadian Tire Series

ARCA Racing Series
(key) (Bold – Pole position awarded by qualifying time. Italics – Pole position earned by points standings or practice time. * – Most laps led.)

References

External links

 

Living people
1990 births
Sportspeople from Plano, Texas
Racing drivers from Dallas
Racing drivers from Texas
NASCAR drivers
ARCA Menards Series drivers
CARS Tour drivers
NASCAR Truck Series champions